Skjervøy Idrettsklubb is a Norwegian sports club from Skjervøy, Troms. It has sections for association football, team handball, track and field, Nordic skiing and biathlon.

It was established on 6 June 1930.

The men's football team currently plays in the 3. divisjon, the fourth tier of the Norwegian football league system. It last played in the 2. divisjon in 2003. It then won its 3. divisjon group and contested playoffs to the 2. divisjon in 2008, but lost to Bossekop UL.

References

 Official site 

Football clubs in Norway
Sport in Troms
Association football clubs established in 1930
1930 establishments in Norway